Greyhound racing is a popular sport in New Zealand. There are ten clubs operating in New Zealand and they are affiliated to Greyhound Racing New Zealand (GRNZ). Racing in New Zealand is governed by the New Zealand Racing Board (NZRB) in accordance with the Racing Act 2003. Totalisator betting was not allowed until 1981.

Most have modern facilities including grandstand restaurants with Totalisator Agency Board (TAB) betting available.

History
The current oval racing industry was born out of coursing which was seen at the time as a way to help control the population of hares. The first hares were brought to New Zealand in 1868 as hunting quarry but a gestation period of around 40 days resulted in problems for farmers and British greyhounds were imported to help control them. The New Zealand Federation of Coursing Clubs was formed in 1877 and the National Coursing Association was formed in 1908.

Experiments with artificial hares began in 1934 and the 'Tin Hare' (a metal arm system on a rail around an oval track) was first officially used for a race meeting at Christchurch in 1948. This is regarded as the birth of modern greyhound racing in New Zealand.

In 1954 the New Zealand Greyhound Racing Association was formed following the ban on coursing. In 1978 The modern oval form of racing was granted totalisator betting. Three years later in 1981 the industry was granted off-site totalisator betting and the TAB. In 2009 the NZGRA became the GRNZ which it is called today.

Stadiums and clubs
There are ten racing clubs in New Zealand who are directly responsible for the management of racetracks. Around 700 dogs are bred each year for racing, and around 200–300 are imported from Australia.
Ashburton Greyhound Racing Club  
Auckland Greyhound Racing Club  
Christchurch Greyhound Racing Club  
Otago Greyhound Racing Club  
Palmerston North Greyhound Racing Club 
Southland Greyhound Racing Club  
Taranaki Greyhound Racing Club  
Tokoroa Greyhound Racing Club  
Waikato Greyhound Racing Club  
Wanganui Greyhound Racing Club

General information
Jacket colours
Greyhound racing in New Zealand has a standard colour scheme similar to Greyhound racing in Australia with the exception of trap/box 6..

 Box 1 = Red
 Box 2 = Black & White Stripes
 Box 3 = White
 Box 4 = Blue
 Box 5 = Yellow
 Box 6 = Green
 Box 7 = Black
 Box 8 = Pink
 Reserve 9 = Green and White stripes
 Reserve 10 = Red White and Blue

Criticism
Following concern over the welfare of racing greyhounds the Greyhound Racing Association initiated an Independent Welfare Review during 2013. The review found no issues into the care of greyhounds in racing but found issues with population management (greyhounds not making the track and greyhounds after retirement). 

In 2014, GRNZ conceded its death and injury toll was too high. Between late 2012 and April 2014, 92 dogs suffered serious injuries on the track and 64 were euthanased. In 2016, a top trainer claimed poor track conditions were putting greyhound lives at risk. He additionally said he believed GRNZ was only paying lip service to animal welfare and painting over the problems within the industry.

In 2017 a second report was commissioned, this time by the New Zealand Racing Board, led by former High Court Judge Rodney Hansen who made 20 recommendations to further advance the welfare of greyhounds. On Dec 20 2017, the New Zealand government's Minister for Racing Hon Winston Peters, said the reports findings were "disturbing and deeply disappointing", and "simply unacceptable". In December 2018 the New Zealand government considered a second petition from Aaron Cross and 129 others seeking a prohibition on racing. The government requested that the greyhound racing industry continued to implement the Hansen recommendations and invited the NZGRA to update them on their progress. In April 2021, the New Zealand government launched a further review in response to a claimed lack of progress implementing the recommendations of the 2017 Hansen review.

References

New Zealand
Sport in New Zealand